Schwarzer See is a lake at Zickhusen in the west of Mecklenburg-Vorpommern, Germany.

Lakes of Mecklenburg-Western Pomerania